When You're Smiling is a 1950 American musical film directed by Joseph Santley and starring Jerome Courtland, Frankie Laine and Lola Albright.

Plot

Cast
 Jerome Courtland as Gerald Durham  
 Frankie Laine as Frankie Laine 
 Billy Daniels as Billy Daniels
 Lola Albright as Peggy Martin  
 Jerome Cowan as Herbert Reynolds  
 Margo Woode as Linda Reynolds  
 Collette Lyons as Nan Doran 
 Robert Shayne as Jack Lacey  
 Don Otis as Don Otis  
 Ray Teal as Steve  
 Jimmy Lloyd as Dave  
 Donna Hamilton as Margie 
 Edward Earle as Foster  
 Frank Nelson as Jeweler  
 Neyle Morrow as Carlo

References

Bibliography
 Michael L. Stephens. Art Directors in Cinema: A Worldwide Biographical Dictionary. McFarland, 1998.

External links
 

1950 films
1950 musical films
1950s English-language films
American musical films
Films directed by Joseph Santley
Columbia Pictures films
American black-and-white films
1950s American films